Nezamabad Rural District is a rural district (dehestan) in the Central District of Azadshahr County, Golestan Province, Iran. At the 2006 census, its population was 14,899, in 3,442 families.  The rural district has 19 villages.

References 

Rural Districts of Golestan Province
Azadshahr County